Elements Casino Brantford  formerly known as OLG Casino Brantford, and the Brantford Charity Casino, is a charity casino located in Brantford, Ontario.

Summary
Since its opening in 1999, the casino has drawn a small number of tourists into this city, though far fewer than was first predicted since numerous other casinos have been opened nearby and slot machines have been added to area racetracks.

A small portion of the profits from this, and other Ontario charity casinos, goes to the Trillium Foundation which metes out the funds to qualified charities. A small portion of the profits from the slot machines go to the City of Brantford as the facility's host. Casino Brantford has 55 table games including blackjack, baccarat, Let It Ride, Sic Bo, Three card poker, Spanish 21, roulette, and craps. The casino also has numerous slot machines, and a 14-table Texas Hold 'Em poker room.

It is located near the Sanderson Centre for the Performing Arts, an upscale theater.

In May 2018 management of the casino was taken over by Great Canadian Gaming and the name was changed to Elements Casino Brantford.

See also
 List of casinos in Canada

References

Casinos in Ontario
1999 establishments in Ontario
Buildings and structures in Brantford
Tourist attractions in the County of Brant
Casinos completed in 1999